Anna Catherina "Toos" Grol-Overling (20 March 1931 – 12 January 2023) was a Dutch teacher and politician. A member of the Christian Democratic Appeal, she served in the Senate from 1982 to 1999.

Grol-Overling died in Deventer on 12 January 2023, at the age of 91.

References

1931 births
2023 deaths
Catholic People's Party politicians
Christian Democratic Appeal politicians
Members of the Provincial Council of Overijssel
Members of the Senate (Netherlands)
People from Doetinchem